NFN may refer to:

 National Froebel Network, set up by the National Froebel Foundation
 "Normal for Norfolk", an example of medical slang
 Nafferton railway station (National Rail station code), England
 , a nudist federation in the Netherlands; see International Naturist Federation
 Nepal Federatie Nederland, an advocacy organization for the relations between Nepal and the Netherlands